Gaston Lavalley (29 November 1834 in Vouilly – 1922) was a French writer, historian and art historian. He was a son of the engineer Louis-Auguste Lavalley-Dupéroux (1800–1885) and brother to Georges-Aimar Lavalley (1830–1882), later director of Caen's Musée des Antiquité and writer on religious buildings in the diocese of Bayeux. Gaston studied law before being made chief curator of the town library in Caen in 1870. Specialising in the history of Normandy, he contributed to many local and national journals and wrote many books, of which the main one is Légendes normandes.

Bibliography 
Légendes normandes, 1867
Après l'auto-da-fé. 1872
Aurélien, 1863
Arromanches et ses environs, 1867
Les Balayeuses, 1871
Les Carabots, scènes de la Révolution, 1874
Caen, son histoire et ses monuments, 1877
Les Compagnies du papeguay, particulièrement à Caen, 1881
Le Drame du camp de Vaussieux, 1889
Le Général Nu-Pieds, 1898
Le Duc d'Aumont et les Cent-jours en Normandie, d'après des documents inédits, 1899
Le duc d'Aumont et les Cent-Jours en Normandie, 1899
Le grand Carnot, chansonnier, 1900–1910
Un chauvin de la science, 1900
Une émeute originale des mineurs de Littry en 1792, d'après des documents complètement inédits, 1904
La Censure théâtrale à Caen en l'an VII, 1908
L'Arme blanche sous la Révolution, étude historique, 1912
Trois journées de Napoléon à Caen en 1811, et passage de Marie-Louise en 1813, 1913
Les Duellistes de Caen de l'an IV à 1848 et le bretteur Alexis Dumesnil, 1914

External links 
Gaston Lavalley on French French Wikisource
Biography
 
 

1834 births
1922 deaths
People from Isigny-sur-Mer
20th-century French historians
French art historians
History of Normandy
French male non-fiction writers
19th-century French historians